We Are Domi, formerly known as Domi (stylised in all caps), is a Czech-Norwegian electropop band formed in Leeds, United Kingdom in 2016. The band consists of lead vocalist Dominika Hašková, guitarist Casper Hatlestad, and keyboardist Benjamin Rekstad. The three met during their studies at the Leeds College of Music.

Having won the Czech national selection ESCZ 2022 in December 2021, the band represented the Czech Republic in the Eurovision Song Contest 2022 with the song "Lights Off".

History 
We Are Domi was originally founded as a one-time project to serve as Hašková's backup band for an examination concert in 2016. Besides Hašková, Hatlestad and Rekstad, it included Norwegian drummer Jostein Braaten, and British keyboardist and backing vocalist Jemma Freese, who were all studying at the Leeds College of Music at the time. After the project, they decided to continue making music together. In 2019, their debut single "Let Me Follow" was released. Braaten and Freese later left the band. In 2020, the band relocated from the United Kingdom to Prague, Czech Republic.

Eurovision Song Contest 2022 
In 2021, the band was announced as one of the seven acts participating in the music competition ESCZ 2022, which served as the Czech national selection for the Eurovision Song Contest 2022. The winner was determined by a combination of votes from an international jury panel (50%), votes from the international public (25%), and votes from the Czech public (25%). Votes could be cast between 7 and 15 December 2021 via the official Eurovision Song Contest app. On 16 December 2021, "Lights Off" by We Are Domi was announced as the winner, having received a total of 21 points.

At the Eurovision Song Contest in Turin We Are Domi, representing the Czech Republic, were the last to perform in the second semi-final, closing the show. They finished in 4th place with 227 points (a combination of 102 jury points and 125 televote points), meaning that they qualified to the grand final. This was the fourth time the Czech Republic qualified to the final of the Eurovision Song Contest. We Are Domi opened the final, performing first out of 25 countries. Ultimately, they finished in 21st place, with 38 points (33 jury, 5 televote).

Members 
Dominika Hašková is a Czech-American singer, songwriter and musical actress. She was born on 3 May 1995 in Buffalo, New York to Czech parents. Her father is the well-known ice hockey player Dominik Hašek, who played for the Buffalo Sabres at the time of her birth. In 2010, Hašková participated in the first season of the talent show Česko Slovensko má talent, reaching the final. In 2013, she played the role of Florence Vassy in the Czech version of the musical Chess.

Casper Hatlestad and Benjamin Rekstad are Norwegian musicians and songwriters. Hatlestad was born on 8 April 1994, and grew up in Sola near Stavanger, Norway. For his master's project, he developed a "bow guitar" – a guitar that is played with a bow. Rekstad was born on 18 February 1995, and grew up in Nesodden, Norway. Hatlestad and Rekstad have both been members of the bands Skogmus and the Wardrobe Quintet, prior to joining We Are Domi. Since 2020, they have worked as music teachers at the International School of Music and Fine Arts in Prague.

Current members 
 Dominika Hašková (2016–present) – lead vocals
 Casper Hatlestad (2016–present) – guitar
 Benjamin Rekstad (2016–present) – keyboards

Former members 
 Jostein Braaten (2016–2019) – drums
 Jemma Freese (2016–2020) – keyboards, backing vocals
 Theo Goss (2020) – drums
 Paolo Mazzoni (2020) – drums

Discography

Singles

As lead artist

As featured artist

References 

2016 establishments in England
Czech pop music groups
Eurovision Song Contest entrants of 2022
Eurovision Song Contest entrants for the Czech Republic
Musical groups established in 2016
Musical groups from Leeds
Musical groups from Prague
Norwegian pop music groups